Adam Dennis Erne (born April 20, 1995) is an American professional ice hockey winger for the  Detroit Red Wings of the National Hockey League (NHL). He was selected by the Lightning in the 2nd round (33rd overall) of the 2013 NHL Entry Draft.

Playing career

Juniors

Erne grew up playing hockey in North Branford, Connecticut before moving to Los Angeles at the age of 13 to skate for a select team. He began his junior career with the Indiana Ice of the United States Hockey League. In his one-season, he recorded 10 goals and 18 points over 45 games. The Ice's head coach, Charlie Skjodt, told The Hockey News that Erne often led the team in hits. He was eventually offered a scholarship to play ice hockey at Boston University.

On April 1, 2014, the Lightning signed Erne to an entry-level contract.

In his final season with the Quebec Remparts, Erne was awarded the Guy Lafleur Trophy as the Quebec Major Junior Hockey League playoff most valuable player, following the team's game seven President Cup final victory. The Remparts ultimately fell to the Kelowna Rockets in the 2015 Memorial Cup. During the regular season, Erne recorded 41 goals and 45 assists for 86 points, along with a plus-21 and 102 penalty minutes.

Professional
On September 19, 2013, the NHL Department of Player safety announced that Erne would have a hearing for an incident during a preseason game against the St. Louis Blues on Wednesday night at the Amway Center in Orlando, Florida. In the first period, Erne was assessed a minor penalty for an illegal check to the head for a hit on St. Louis forward Vladimir Sobotka. Sobotka left the game after the hit and did not return. On the same day, the NHL announced that Erne had been suspended for three preseason games for delivering an illegal check to the head of Sobotka.

On January 2, 2017, the Lightning recalled Erne from the Syracuse Crunch. On January 3, 2017, Lightning head coach, Jon Cooper, informed the media that Erne would be making his NHL debut. Erne found out that he was making his NHL debut when he walked into the room that morning and saw his number on the board. Erne made his NHL debut that night against the Winnipeg Jets. On March 3, 2017, Erne recorded his first career NHL goal and point against the Pittsburgh Penguins at PPG Paints Arena. On March 20, 2018, Erne recorded his first career NHL assist. The assist came in a 4–3 Lightning win over the visiting Toronto Maple Leafs.

On August 14, 2019, Erne was traded to the Detroit Red Wings in exchange for a fourth-round pick in the 2020 NHL Entry Draft.

Career statistics

Regular season and playoffs

International

Awards and honors

References

External links 

1995 births
American men's ice hockey left wingers
Detroit Red Wings players
Grand Rapids Griffins players
Ice hockey players from Connecticut
Indiana Ice players
Living people
Quebec Remparts players
Syracuse Crunch players
Tampa Bay Lightning draft picks
Tampa Bay Lightning players